Mridha Bonam Mridha is a 2021 Bangladeshi courtroom film. Directed by Roni Bhowmik, the film stars Siam Ahmed, Nova and Tariq Anam Khan in lead roles.

Cast 
 Siam Ahmed – Ashfaqul Mridha
 Nova – Oishi
 Tariq Anam Khan – Ashraful Mridha
 Sanjida Preeti – Barrister Charlene
 Nima Rahman – Judge
 Milon Bhattacharya – Mozammel
 Masudul Amin Rintu – Boss
 Taufiqul Iman – Aishe's father
 Anshuman Chatterjee – Charlene's father

Production and release 
Mridha Bonam Mridha began shooting in February 2021 and wrapped up in August. It was the first feature film directed by Roni Bhowmik. The film was shot in Dhaka and Chittagong. The soundtrack of the film is composed by Emon Saha.

The film got approval from the censor board on December 12. Its premiere was held in Dhaka on 20 December. Then the film was released in 30 cinemas in Bangladesh on 24 December. The film was released on the online platform "Toffee" on the occasion of Eid-ul-Fitr in 2022. The film was also aired on Maasranga Television.

Music

Soundtracks

Awards and nominations

References

External links 
 
 
 Mridha Vs Mridha on Toffee

2021 films
2020s Bengali-language films
Bengali-language Bangladeshi films
Bangladeshi courtroom films
Films shot in Dhaka
Films shot in Chittagong Division